"I Do, I Do, I Do, I Do, I Do" is song by Swedish pop group ABBA. It was the third single to be released from their third studio album, ABBA (1975). The song was written by Benny Andersson, Björn Ulvaeus and their manager Stig Anderson, and was released in April 1975 with "Rock Me" as the B-side.

The song was recorded on 21 February 1975 at Glen Studio, and was inspired by the European schlager music of the 1950s, as well as the saxophone sound of '50s American orchestra leader Billy Vaughn.

History
After the release of "Waterloo", ABBA were having difficulty establishing themselves as an act with longevity. "I Do, I Do, I Do, I Do, I Do", in many cases, put ABBA firmly back in the spotlight. With a rousing saxophone tune and homage to 1950s Schlager music, "I Do, I Do, I Do, I Do, I Do" became a significant improvement on the international charts, although it made little impact in Britain. The song's popularity was boosted (particularly in Australia) by the release of a promo clip shown on television.

Reception
"I Do, I Do, I Do, I Do, I Do" was a notable hit in a number of countries, and was the song that sparked "ABBA-mania" in Australia, becoming ABBA's first chart-topper there. With "Mamma Mia" and "SOS" to follow, this gave the group a run of 14 consecutive weeks at the top of the Australian charts. "I Do, I Do, I Do, I Do, I Do" also topped the charts in France, New Zealand, Switzerland and South Africa and hit the Top 5 in Norway, Belgium, the Netherlands, Austria and Rhodesia (all in 1975). The song also reached No. 15 in the United States in early 1976. A notable exception to the song's success was in the UK Singles Chart, a market that ABBA was aiming to conquer. Although it did return them to the Top 40 (after their previous UK single "So Long" had failed to chart), it stalled at No. 38. Thus, the musical direction taken in the song was not used again for some time. This marked the only time that an ABBA song had more success in the United States than in Britain. Later in 1975, ABBA found success in the UK with "SOS", which cemented the group's success in Australia and elsewhere. 

Cash Box said "richly textured vocals give this fifties sounding shuffle an extra push, push, push, push" and praised the "excellent horn riff." Record World said that "this single should be the one to finally make people sit up and take note" of ABBA in the US.

Track listing
 a. "I Do, I Do, I Do, I Do, I Do"
 b. "Rock Me"

Personnel
ABBA
Agnetha Fältskog – lead and backing vocals
Anni-Frid Lyngstad – lead and backing vocals
 Björn Ulvaeus – backing vocals, rhythm guitar
 Benny Andersson – backing vocals, keyboards
Additional musicians and production staff
 Lasse Wellander – lead guitar 
 Mike Watson – bass
 Roger Palm – drums
 Ulf Andersson – saxophones

Charts

Weekly charts

Year-end charts

Certifications and sales

Cover versions
 The saxophone arrangement early made the song an ideal for several dansband covers, like Ingmar Nordströms on the 1975 album Saxparty 2.
 In 1975, Seija Simola released the song as a single, rendered in Finnish as "Vai Niin, Vai Niin, Vai Niin, Vai Niin, Vai Niin" – vai niin translates as "I see". Under the title "Vai Niin" this rendering was also recorded by Lea Laven for her album Lea (1975).
 In 1978, a Swedish country band called Nashville Train (which included some of ABBA's own backing band members) covered the song in 1977 on their album ABBA Our Way, released on the Polar Music label in Sweden.
 In 2000, Swedish band The Black Sweden recorded a version for their tribute album Gold. This version includes a riff from the ZZ Top song "Tush".
 The song appears in the second act of the Mamma Mia! musical. In the context of the musical, Sky and Sophie call off the wedding. The song is used when Sam and Donna get married instead. Although it is one of several songs featured in the 2008 Mamma Mia! movie adaptation, it was not included on the official soundtrack.

References

1975 singles
1975 songs
1976 singles
ABBA songs
Ingmar Nordströms songs
Music videos directed by Lasse Hallström
Number-one singles in Australia
Number-one singles in New Zealand
Number-one singles in South Africa
Number-one singles in Switzerland
Polar Music singles
Songs about marriage
Songs written by Benny Andersson and Björn Ulvaeus
Songs written by Stig Anderson